The Clearwater River is on the West Coast of the South Island of New Zealand. The river originates on the northern slopes of Mt Mitchell on the eastern end of the Victoria Range, only one valley north of the Fox Glacier and Fox River. Clearwater River and its tributary creeks drain land to the north of the Cook (Weheka) River.  The river flows under a bridge of  just north of the Fox Glacier township and passes close to Lake Matheson shortly after before flowing into Cook River, which drains into the Tasman Sea.

Westland District
Rivers of the West Coast, New Zealand
Rivers of New Zealand